Lucy Garland (born 15 December 1996) is an English professional wrestler currently signed to WWE where she performs on the NXT brand under the ring name Stevie Turner. Before signing to WWE, she previously wrestled under the ring name Bobbi Tyler.

Professional wrestling career 
Under the ring name Bobbi Tyler, Garland spent five years wrestling on the UK independent circuit from June 2016 to December 2020. Within that span, Tyler held six women's titles, two of which she won while with Pro Wrestling Pride, and two others while wrestling in International Pro Wrestling: United Kingdom, a single title while in House Of Glory, and a single title reign while in Ultimate Pro Wrestling.

On March 25, 2021, Garland was signed to WWE under the ring name Stevie Turner. Turner made her WWE debut on the 1 April episode of NXT UK facing Aoife Valkyrie in which she lost. Behind the scenes, she declared that she had traveled the world to get there in which she was close to defeating one of the most dominant women of the brand. On May 6, 2021, a promo cartoon came out in which she stated that she would go after every woman in NXT UK by admitting and naming herself "The Fourth Dimension 4D". With her new gimmick, on May 12, Turner defeated Laura Di Matteo. Turner had a few victories until she faced then-champion Meiko Satomura at the WWE Performance Center, interrupting her in her training, which would give her a shot at the title. On August 19, she lost to Satomura in the title bout. Due to the brand closure in order to be rebranded as NXT Europe, Turner did not appear the rest of the year on television.

At NXT: New Year's Evil, Turner debuted on NXT through a televised promo now with the gimmick of a streamer giving her criticism of some women's matches. On January 31, 2023, Turner made her television debut defeating Dani Palmer.

Championships and accomplishments 
House Of Glory
HOG Women's Championship (1 time)
International Pro Wrestling: United Kingdom
IPW:UK Women's Championship (2 times)
Pro Wrestling Pride
PWP Catch Division Championship (1 times)
PWP Women's Championship (2 times)
Ultimate Pro Wrestling
UPW Women's Championship (1 time)

References

External links 
 
 

1996 births
Living people
People from Hitchin
English female professional wrestlers
20th-century English women
21st-century English women
21st-century professional wrestlers